Magic is the third album from Djumbo. It was released as a normal version and also a special version with an extra book in November 2008.

Track listing
On album

 Boyz & Girlz
 Best Friends
 Anything
 Party Party
 I Want You To Know
 Locomotion
 Djumbo Medley

On CD-ROM

 The Best Of Real Djumbo
 Videoclip Boyz & Girlz
 Making of Boyz & Girlz
 Videoclip Boy I Like Ya
 Making of Boy I Like Ya
 Videoclip Abracadabra
 Videoclip Dit Is Real

Singles
 Boyz & Girlz (4 September 2008)

References

2008 albums
Djumbo albums